The 2013 Varsity Football challenge was the first season of a South African university association football competition. It involved some of the top football playing universities in the country, which belong to the University Sports Company. The tournament is run by Varsity Sports South Africa, and is endorsed by the South African Football Association and University Sport South Africa.

The men's competition was won by UP-Tuks and the women's competition by University of Johannesburg.

History
The Varsity Cup tournament was founded in 2008, featuring the rugby teams of eight universities. Varsity Sports was expanded in 2012 to include other sporting codes. University Sport South Africa discussed the Varsity Football proposal at its 2012 annual general meeting. The idea was initially rejected, as it was seen to split the member institutions. However, it was later accepted, and 2013 was the inaugural season of Varsity Football, with an 8 team men's tournament. A four team women's tournament is also being played.

Participating Teams

The eight teams competing in the men's Varsity Football challenge are:

The four teams competing in the women's Varsity Football challenge are:

Qualification
For both the men's and women's tournaments, qualification was based on the 2012 University Sports South Africa National Club Championships. In order to qualify, men's teams need to be one of the eight highest placed teams associated with Varsity Sports. Women's teams needed to be one of the semi-finalists, and also be associated with Varsity Sports.

For the men's tournament, UP-Tuks qualified as USSA champions, and NWU-Mafikeng as losing finalists. TUT-Pretoria qualified as a losing semi-finalist, while UKZN Pietermaritzburg, also a losing semi-finalist, was ineligible, not being linked to Varsity Sports. Wits and UWC qualified as losing quarter finalists, while WSU-Potsdam and CPUT, both of which also lost in the quarter finals were ineligible. UCT, ranked 9th, UFS, ranked 11th and NMMU, ranked 14th were invited. Higher placed University of Venda, WSU-Ibika and UKZN-Edgewood were not invited, as they are not linked to Varsity Sports.

For the women's tournament, TUT-Pretoria was invited as the USSA women's champion. UP-Tuks qualified as the losing finalist, and UJ as a losing semi-finalist. VUT, a losing semi-finalist, was not invited, lacking affiliation with Varsity Sports at the time. As such, 5th ranked University of Limpopo was invited instead.

Standings

Format
The tournament begins with a round robin stage, in which all teams play each other once. After the round robin stage, the top 4 teams will advance to the knockout stage. The teams ranked 1 and 2 will host the semi-finals, against the teams ranked 4 and 3 respectively. The winners will advance to the final, to be hosted by the highest ranking finalist. All matches are played on Mondays. The league scoring system follows a standard scoring system and awards 3 points are awarded for a win, and 1 point for a draw. Teams are separated first on points, and then on goal difference.

Round robin stage
The 2013 season began with the round robin stages on 22 July, which will end on 2 September.
 All times are South African (GMT+2)

Week 1

Week 2

Week 3

Week 4

Week 5

Week 6

Week 7

 1 Matches originally scheduled for NMMU Stadium.
 2 Kick off delayed due to late arrival of officials.

Knockout stage
The top four placed men's teams progressed to the knockout stage, as did all four women's teams.  The semi-finals for both men and women were played on 9 September and the finals on 16 September.

Men's tournament

Semi-finals

Final

Women's tournament

Semi-finals

Final

Notable Players and Coaches
Players and coaches who have since been signed by professional clubs.

 Thabo Mnyamane (University of Pretoria), South African Premier Division

Sponsors

The tournament is sponsored by:
 Cell C
 Debonairs Pizza
 First National Bank
 Samsung

References

External links 
 http://www.varsitysportssa.com/varsity-football

Football
Soccer competitions in South Africa